Vladimír Lulek (21 May 1953, Šťáhlavy – 2 February 1989, Prague) was a Czech murderer who killed his wife and four children on December 22, 1986, and also attempted to kill his neighbour. He was executed on 2 February 1989 at Pankrác Prison in Prague. He was the last person executed in the Czech Socialist Republic. (Štefan Svitek was the last person executed in Czechoslovakia and Slovakia with his death on June 8, 1989)

Footnotes

References 
 Od poslední popravy v Česku uplynulo dvacet let, Novinky.cz, 2 February 2009
 Poslední popravený vrah v Česku před třiceti lety ubodal svou rodinu, iDNES.cz, 22 December 2016

1989 deaths
1953 births
Czech people convicted of murder
Czech mass murderers
People convicted of murder by Czechoslovakia
People executed by the Czechoslovak Socialist Republic by hanging
Executed Czech people
20th-century criminals
Executed Czechoslovak people
Czechoslovak people convicted of murder
Czechoslovak mass murderers
Mass murder in 1986
Executed mass murderers
People from Plzeň-City District
People executed for murder
Familicides
Violence against women in the Czech Republic